St. Joseph is a community in the Canadian province of Nova Scotia, located  in Antigonish County.

References
 St. Joseph on Destination Nova Scotia

Communities in Antigonish County, Nova Scotia
General Service Areas in Nova Scotia